was a Japanese football player. He played for Japan national team.

Club career
Kuwahara was born in Hiroshima on December 22, 1942. After graduating from Chuo University, he joined his local club Toyo Industries in 1965. The club won league champions 5 times (1965, 1966, 1967, 1968 and 1970). The club also won 1965, 1967 and 1969 Emperor's Cup. He retired in 1972. He played 94 games and scored 53 goals in the league.

National team career
In December 1966, he was selected Japan national team for 1966 Asian Games. At this competition, on December 14, he debuted against Malaysia. In 1968, he was selected Japan for 1968 Summer Olympics in Mexico City. He played 2 matches and Japan won Bronze Medal. In 2018, this team was selected Japan Football Hall of Fame. He played 12 games and scored 5 goals for Japan until 1970.

On March 1, 2017, Kuwahara died of pneumonia in Hiroshima at the age of 74.

Club statistics

National team statistics

References

External links

 
 Japan National Football Team Database
Japan Football Hall of Fame (Japan team at 1968 Olympics) at Japan Football Association

1942 births
2017 deaths
Chuo University alumni
Association football people from Hiroshima Prefecture
Japanese footballers
Japan international footballers
Japan Soccer League players
Sanfrecce Hiroshima players
Asian Games medalists in football
Footballers at the 1966 Asian Games
Asian Games bronze medalists for Japan
Olympic footballers of Japan
Olympic medalists in football
Olympic bronze medalists for Japan
Medalists at the 1968 Summer Olympics
Footballers at the 1968 Summer Olympics
Association football forwards
Deaths from pneumonia in Japan
Medalists at the 1966 Asian Games